The singles event at the 2009 Serbia Open men's tennis tournament was won by Novak Djokovic, who defeated Łukasz Kubot in the final.

Seeds
The top four seeds receive a bye into the second round.

Draw

Finals

Top half

Bottom half

External links
Draw
Qualifying Draw

Singles